Bar Bar castle is a historical castle located in Meshgin Shahr County in Ardabil Province, The longevity of this fortress dates back to the 2nd and 3rd centuries AH.

References 

Castles in Iran